Cerithiopsis amabilis is a species of very small sea snails, marine gastropod molluscs in the family Cerithiopsidae. It was described by Bayle in 1880.

References

amabilis
Gastropods described in 1880